The Hurghada Environmental Protection and Conservation Association (formally known as HEPCA) is a Non Governmental Organization that works primarily with marine and land conservation in the Red Sea Governorate in Egypt.

Since its establishment in 1992, HEPCA has been recognized internationally. It was founded by 12 members of the diving community in Hurghada and Safaga, who saw a threat to a fragile eco-system of the Red Sea. Now, HEPCA employs over 700 people, who apart from protecting and conserving the Red Sea are also caring for the sensitive land ecosystems of the Egyptian coastline. HEPCA‘s work also includes resource monitoring and management, public awareness campaigning, solid waste management, scientific research and community development.

References

Environmental organisations based in Egypt
Red Sea Governorate
1992 establishments in Egypt
Organizations established in 1992